Boris Yeltsin Peak is a mountain in the Terskey Ala-too range of the Tian Shan. It is located in the Issyk-Kul Region of Kyrgyzstan. It was renamed in 2002 after the first president of Russia, Boris Yeltsin. Its previous name was Oguz-Bashi.

See also 
 Vladimir Putin Peak (Kyrgyzstan) - named in 2011 for the second president of the Russian Federation Vladimir Putin.

References

External links
 Map K-44-061

Mountains of Kyrgyzstan
Issyk-Kul Region
Boris Yeltsin
Five-thousanders of the Tian Shan